The Albania men's national under-16 basketball team is a national basketball team of Albania, administered by the Albanian Basketball Federation (FSHB). It represents the country in international men's under-16 basketball competitions.

FIBA U16 European Championship participations

See also
Albania men's national basketball team
Albania men's national under-18 basketball team
Albania women's national under-16 basketball team

References

External links
Archived records of Albania team participations

Basketball in Albania
Under-16
Basketball
Men's national under-16 basketball teams